Cnemaspis hangus is a species of gecko from Bukit Hangus, Pahang, Malaysia.

References

Further reading

Amarasinghe, AA Thasun, et al. "A New Species of Cnemaspis (Reptilia: Gekkonidae) from Sumatra, Indonesia." Herpetologica 71.2 (2015): 160–167.
Grismer, L. Lee, et al. "A new insular species of Rock Gecko (Cnemaspis Boulenger) from Pulau Langkawi, Kedah, Peninsular Malaysia." Zootaxa3985.2 (2015): 203–218.

Cnemaspis
Reptiles described in 2014